Sana'a University was established in 1970 as the first and the primary university in the Yemen Arab Republic (North Yemen), now the Republic of Yemen (see also Aden University). It is located in Sanaa, the capital of Yemen, and is currently organized with 17 faculties.
The university includes several accommodation buildings for staff and students and is partnered with the Kuwait University Hospital for medical students.

Overview 

When Sanaa university was first established, it had two faculties: the Faculty of Sharia and Law and the Faculty of Education, which also included the specialties of Colleges of Arts, Sciences and Education. In 1974, those specialties were developed and formed three new faculties: Arts, Science, Education. The Faculty of Sharia and Law celebrated the launch of the Business Department, which became an independent faculty a year later. By that time, the university included five faculties and continued expansion until it included the rest of the other specialties. As of 2005, Sanaa University was composed of twenty faculties with 12 faculties at the main campus of Sanaa and eight others at different branches throughout the country.

The university started postgraduate studies at the start of the 1980s.

Faculties
 
 Faculty of Engineering
 Faculty of Computer & Information Technology
 Faculty of Commerce & Economics
 Faculty of Medicine
 Faculty of Dentistry
 Faculty of Pharmacy
 Faculty of Science
 Faculty of Agriculture
 Faculty of Law & Legislation
 Faculty of Education
 Faculty of Art
 Faculty of Languages
 Faculty of Publication

Notable faculty
Nasser al-Aulaqi, Yemeni Agriculture Minister and president of Sanaa University.

Notable alumni
Hamid al-Ahmar, politician
Yahya Al-Mutawakel, Minister of Industry and Trade
Hoda Ablan, poet
Abdulla A. Alshammam, ambassador to Netherlands, earned a graduate degree in political science in 1982–1983. A Yemeni diplomat, he works at the Ministry of foreign affairs, ambassador.
Tawakel Karman earned a graduate degree in political science. She was awarded the 2011 Nobel Peace Prize. She is the first Yemeni citizen and first Arab woman to win a Nobel Prize
Ahmed Mohammed, politician
Khalid Ahmed, professor of Arabic language, University of Washington
Saqr Alsubaiti, 
Zeyad Ghanem, poet, politician
Mithaq Aljarf, Diplomat, Member of Yemen delegation to United Nations·
Ammar Abdullah Al Nono, Faculty of Sharia and Law, PhD in law from Malaysia.

References

External links
 
 Matriculation guide booklet – Sanaa University, annually revised in Arabic for advanced students.

 
Sanaa
Educational institutions established in 1970
Universities in Yemen
1970 establishments in Yemen